Harry Jacobs may refer to:

 Harry Jacobs (American football) (born 1937), American football player
 Harry Jacobs (tug of war), American tug of war athlete
 Harry Jacobs (Australian footballer) (1913–2000), Australian rules footballer
 Harry Allan Jacobs (1872–1932), American architect

See also
 Harry D. Jacobs High School, a public high school in Algonquin, Illinois
 Henry Jacobs (disambiguation)